Surf Rocket Racers (working title: Surf Rocket Racer), known in Japan as , is a video game developed and published by CRI Middleware and Crave Entertainment for Dreamcast in 2000-2001.

Reception

The game received "mixed" reviews according to the review aggregation website Metacritic. Jim Preston of NextGen called it "a diet, caffeine-free, non-carbonated version of much more interesting games." In Japan, Famitsu gave it a score of 29 out of 40. GamePro gave it an average review, over three months before its U.S. release date.

Notes

References

External links
 

2000 video games
Crave Entertainment games
CRI Middleware games
Dreamcast games
Dreamcast-only games
Multiplayer and single-player video games
Personal watercraft racing video games
Video games developed in Japan